Egger Highlands is a residential neighborhood in the southern section of San Diego. It neighbors Palm City and Nestor to the east, San Diego Bay to the north, Imperial Beach to the southwest and Chula Vista to the northeast. Major thoroughfares include Coronado Avenue, Saturn Boulevard, and Palm Avenue.

History
Egger Highlands is named for the Egger family, which donated land in 1946 to house St. Charles Catholic Church, the area's first Roman Catholic church. Egger Highlands, along with other portions of South San Diego, was annexed by the city of San Diego from San Diego County in 1957.

Facilities and landmarks
Egger Highlands is home to the Robert Egger, Sr. Community Park, located at Coronado Avenue and Saturn Boulevard.

Education
Private schools in Egger Highlands include the St. Charles School.

References

External links

Neighborhoods in San Diego
South Bay (San Diego County)